It's a Shame About Ray is the fifth album by American alternative rock band the Lemonheads, released on June 2, 1992.  The album was produced by the Robb Brothers. At the time of principal recording, the band consisted of Evan Dando (lead vocals, guitar), Juliana Hatfield (bass, backing vocals) and David Ryan (drums). Though not originally on the album, the band's cover of Simon & Garfunkel's "Mrs. Robinson" was added to the album in later pressings after it had become a major worldwide radio hit, and it features a later lineup of the band with Nic Dalton on bass.

History 
The title track was inspired by a quote that band leader Evan Dando had seen in a Sydney newspaper in reference to a kid called Ray who kept getting kicked out of every school he went to. 

The album became an international hit for the band, reaching #31 in the UK Top 100 as well as #5 on the Modern Rock Tracks chart in the U.S. The song was later included at #138 on Pitchfork's "Top 200 Tracks of the 90s" list. The music video features Johnny Depp.

Actress Polly Noonan and her car appear on the cover of the album.

Rereleases
After its initial release, the album was reissued with a cover of the song "Mrs. Robinson", written by Paul Simon and originally recorded by Simon & Garfunkel. The Lemonheads' version was recorded to celebrate the 25th anniversary of the release of the film The Graduate. The band recorded the song in Berlin while on tour, with Nic Dalton on bass guitar. It was released as a single.

The album was reissued by Rhino in 2008 as a collector's edition that includes several demo versions of album tracks, the B-side song "Shaky Ground" and a DVD containing the previously released (on VHS) Two Weeks in Australia.

Notable performances
The Lemonheads toured Australia in late 2010, playing the album in its entirety along with songs from their other albums.

The band performed the entire album at London's Shepherd's Bush Empire on September 14–15, 2005 as part of the All Tomorrow's Parties-curated Don't Look Back concert series, with "Mrs. Robinson" missing from the setlist.

The band will perform the album in its entirety opening for certain dates of Jawbreaker's 2022 spring tour.

Track listing
All songs by Evan Dando unless otherwise stated.
 "Rockin Stroll" - 1:48
 "Confetti" - 2:47
 "It's a Shame About Ray" (words: Dando, Tom Morgan; music: Dando) - 3:08
 "Rudderless" - 3:21
 "My Drug Buddy"- 2:52
 "The Turnpike Down" - 2:34
 "Bit Part" (studio version) (words: Dando, Morgan; music: Dando) - 1:52
 "Alison's Starting to Happen" - 2:00
 "Hannah & Gabi" - 2:41
 "Kitchen" (Nic Dalton) - 2:55
 "Ceiling Fan in My Spoon" - 2:00
 "Frank Mills" (James Rado, Gerome Ragni, Galt MacDermot) - 1:45
Re-release bonus track
"Mrs. Robinson" (Paul Simon) - 3:45

Bonus material
 "Shaky Ground" (B-side) - 1:49
 "It's a Shame About Ray" (demo version) - 2:57
 "Rockin Stroll" (demo version) - 1:49
 "My Drug Buddy" (demo version) - 2:47
 "Hannah & Gabi" (demo version) - 2:27
 "Kitchen" (demo version) - 3:13
 "Bit Part" (demo version) - 1:55
 "Rudderless" (demo version) - 3:21
 "Ceiling Fan in My Spoon" (demo version) - 2:18
 "Confetti" (demo version) - 1:16

Personnel
The Lemonheads
Evan Dando – guitar, vocals
Juliana Hatfield – bass guitar, backup vocals
David Ryan – drums
Nic Dalton – bass guitar on "Mrs. Robinson"
Jeff "Skunk" Baxter – slide guitar on "Hannah & Gabi"

Charts

Certifications

References

The Lemonheads albums
1992 albums
Atlantic Records albums
Grunge albums